Bernadette Lafont (28 October 1938 – 25 July 2013) was a French actress who appeared in more than 120 feature films. She has been considered "the face of French New Wave". In 1999 she told The New York Times her work was "the motor of my existence".

Career
Bernadette Lafont had her debut in Les Mistons ("The Mischief Makers") in 1958 and became part of the Nouvelle Vague in the 1960s because of her films with François Truffaut and Claude Chabrol.
In 1986 Lafont was awarded a César Award for Best Actress in a Supporting Role for  An Impudent Girl (L'Effrontée). In the following year, she was again nominated, this time for Masques. For her long service to the French motion picture industry, she was awarded an Honorary César in 2003 . In May 2007, she chaired the jury for the fifth edition of the Award for Education presented at the 60th Cannes Film Festival. She was made an Officer of the Legion of Honor on 14 July 2009.

Her complete filmography includes TV shows, and she also worked successfully as a stage actress.

Her last film Paulette, released in 2013, was a success in and outside France.

Personal life
Lafont had three children with her husband Diourka Medveczky: David, Elisabeth and Pauline (1963–1988).

In 1971, Lafont signed the Manifesto of the 343, which publicly announced she had an illegal abortion.

Death 
Lafont died from complications of heart failure following heart attack on 25 July 2013 at Nimes, France the age of 74. Her body was cremated and her ashes were given to her family

Selected filmography

References

External links

 
 

1938 births
2013 deaths
Best Supporting Actress César Award winners
César Honorary Award recipients
French film actresses
Officiers of the Légion d'honneur
Officers of the Ordre national du Mérite
Commandeurs of the Ordre des Arts et des Lettres
People from Nîmes
20th-century French actresses
21st-century French actresses
Signatories of the 1971 Manifesto of the 343